Cristian Marius Matei (born 12 March 1987), is a Romanian futsal player who plays for AutoBergamo Deva and the Romanian national futsal team.

References

External links
UEFA profile

1987 births
Living people
Romanian men's futsal players